Anna Danesi (born 20 April 1996) is an Italian volleyball player. She is part of the Italy women's national volleyball team. 

 With the national team she competed at the 2016 Olympic Games in Rio de Janeiro.

Awards

Clubs
 2016 Italian Supercup -  Champions, with Imoco Volley Conegliano
 2016-17 Italian Cup (Coppa Italia) -  Champions, with Imoco Volley Conegliano
 2016–17 CEV Champions League -  Runner-Up, with Imoco Volley Conegliano
 2017–18 Italian League -  Champion, with Imoco Volley Conegliano
 2018 Italian Supercup -  Champions, with Imoco Volley Conegliano
 2018–19 Italian League -  Champion, with Imoco Volley Conegliano
 2018–19 CEV Champions League -  Runner-Up, with Imoco Volley Conegliano

Individuals
 2022 FIVB World Championship "Best Middle Blocker"
 2021 Women's European Volleyball Championship "Best Middle Blocker"

References

External links

1996 births
Living people
Italian women's volleyball players
Sportspeople from Brescia
Volleyball players at the 2016 Summer Olympics
Olympic volleyball players of Italy
Volleyball players at the 2020 Summer Olympics